Peter Howard Russell  (born 1932) is a Canadian political scientist, serving as professor emeritus of political science at the University of Toronto, where he taught from 1958 to 1997. He was a member of the Toronto chapter of Alpha Delta Phi. He was the Principal of Innis College, at the University of Toronto, from 1973 to 1978. He is the author of several books including: Two Cheers for Minority Government: The Evolution of Canadian Parliamentary Democracy, Constitutional Odyssey: Can Canadians Become a Sovereign People?, and Recognizing Aboriginal Title: The Mabo Case and Indigenous Resistance to English Settler Colonialism.

Russell is an alumnus of the University of Toronto Schools, Trinity College in the University of Toronto, and the University of Oxford, where he studied as a Rhodes Scholar.

Russell was the 2012 winner of the American Political Science Association's Mildred A. Schwartz Award. He is also an Officer of the Order of Canada.

Russell was Director of Research for the McDonald Commission on the RCMP, a member of the Federal Task Force on Comprehensive Land Claims, President of the Canadian Political Science Association, and chair of the Research Advisory Committee for the Royal Commission on Aboriginal Peoples.

References

External links 

 Peter H. Russell archival papers held at the University of Toronto Archives and Records Management Services

1932 births
20th-century Canadian non-fiction writers
21st-century Canadian non-fiction writers
Canadian academic administrators
Canadian Anglicans
Canadian political scientists
Canadian Rhodes Scholars
Academic staff of the University of Toronto
Living people
Companions of the Order of Canada
Trinity College (Canada) alumni
Presidents of the Canadian Political Science Association